Patrice Wymore Flynn (born Patricia Wymore; December 17, 1926 – March 22, 2014) was an American film, television and stage actress of the 1950s and 1960s, known for her marriage to Errol Flynn.

Early life and stage career
Born Patricia Wymore in Miltonvale, Kansas, to a family of vaudeville performers, she began touring with them at the age of six. By the time she reached adulthood, she was an accomplished dancer with a good singing voice. She auditioned in New York City for a part in Up in Central Park, in which she performed in 1947.

Still "Patricia Wymore," she then starred, fourth billed, with Johnny Downs, Red Buttons, and Jet McDonald in the 1948 Broadway musical Hold It!, for which she won a Theatre World Award for "Promising Actress". This was followed by a five-month stint in the revue All for Love in 1949, where she was discovered by a talent scout from Warner Bros. who signed her up.

Film career
Her first film appearance under the name "Patrice Wymore" was in the 1950 film Tea for Two, opposite Doris Day and Gordon MacRae, where she made an impression with the Latin-flavoured rendition of "Crazy Rhythm". That same year she starred in Rocky Mountain opposite Hollywood legend Errol Flynn, with whom she would become romantically involved. Flynn and Wymore were traveling and living in Europe, mainly in Mallorca aboard , Flynn's yacht. At the age of 23, she married the 41-year-old actor in October 1950 at the Lutheran Church, Nice, France. Wymore continued to act, appearing in several films over the next few years, including the musical I'll See You in My Dreams (1951), her second film alongside Doris Day. She also guest-starred as herself in the 1951 musical film Starlift, performing the song "Liza (All the Clouds'll Roll Away)." It was followed by a role as saloon singer in the Kirk Douglas feature The Big Trees (1952) and a part in the musical comedy She's Working Her Way Through College, starring Virginia Mayo, in the same year. In 1953, she appeared alongside Mayo in the musical dramedy She's Back on Broadway, and that same year she starred opposite Randolph Scott in The Man Behind the Gun. By this stage Wymore had fulfilled her contract with Warner and was released.

She temporarily retired from Hollywood after giving birth to her daughter, Arnella Flynn, born December 25, 1953.<ref name="IndyObit"/> The daughter would later become a fashion model in Europe. In 1955 she appeared with her husband Errol Flynn and Anna Neagle in the film version of  King's Rhapsody. Although only in his forties, Flynn was already in a physical and mental decline by the time they married. Wymore took a break from acting to care for her now ailing husband, and to better raise their daughter, while settling on their estate in Jamaica. However, due to Flynn's alcohol and drug addictions, the couple separated. They never divorced, however, and were still married at the time of his death on October 14, 1959.

Later career and personal life
Following Flynn's death, Wymore returned to acting, mostly in summer stock musicals such as Carnival!, Guys and Dolls, Irma La Douce, and Gentlemen Prefer Blondes. She made a memorable appearance as Adele Elkstrom, Frank Sinatra's character's girlfriend, in the hit film Ocean's 11 in 1960.

She made three guest appearances on Perry Mason. In 1963 she appeared twice: as Maureen Norland in "The Case of the Libelous Locket," and as Jane Alder in "The Case of the Badgered Brother." In 1965 she played murder victim and title character Victoria Dawn in "The Case of the Murderous Mermaid." That year she was also cast in the short-lived soap opera Never Too Young, and in 1966 she appeared in the film Chamber of Horrors. Her last appearance was on the television series F Troop in 1967, after which she retired.

Flynn had left her a  coconut plantation near Castle, in the parish of Portland, Jamaica, as well as a mansion and a cattle ranch. After her retirement she returned to Jamaica, where she opened a boutique and wicker furniture manufacturing business. She continued to be active in Flynn's estate, and often appeared at dedications in his honor up to the time of her death. Her grandson Luke noted 'she was as passionate about her farm as much as the movies'.

After suffering with a pulmonary disease for a year, Wymore, aged 87, died of natural causes in Portland, Jamaica, on March 22, 2014. She is survived by her grandson Luke Flynn who remembered her as 'a tough, resilient and elegant woman'.

Filmography

References

External links
 
 
 
 Errol Flynn marries Patrice Wymore (British Pathe - newsreel)
 Interview: Patrice Wymore remembers Errol Flynn (Ft. Wayne News-Sentinel, 2014).

1926 births
2014 deaths
20th-century American actresses
American film actresses
American television actresses
American musical theatre actresses
Theatre World Award winners
People from Cloud County, Kansas
Burials at Forest Lawn Memorial Park (Glendale)
21st-century American women